Super Mom is an 2018 Indian-Tamil-language children reality television show airs on Zee Tamil and streamed on ZEE5. Over four years, Super Mom has rolled out three seasons and Archana Chandhoke and her daughter Zaara Vineet has continued as a host for three seasons.

The show about Tamil Television celebrity moms and their kids, where they indulge in various fun games and activities together. The winner of this game show will be crowned as the “Super Mom”. The first season was premiered on 4 November 2018.

Production
The show was premiered on 4 November 2018 as scheduled. This show provided a platform to prove their mettle, capability, coordination and strength of the Super Mom, there are several celebrity moms and children pairs who participate in the show.

Overview

Season 1
The first season aired on every Sunday at 20:00 from 4 November 2018 to 3 March 2019 and ended with 17 Episodes. The winner of the season was Television Actress Swetha and her son Hrithik. Actress Preethi and her daughter Laya was the runner-up, Deepa and her son Godwin and Krithika Laddu and her daughter Srika was Second Runner-up.

Contestants 
 Anitha Venkat and Aishwarya
 Deepa and Godwin
 Jayashree and Rethva
 Krithika and Vishnu
 Krithika Laddu and Srika
 Monica and Jaden
 Preethi and Laya
 Swetha and Hrithik Bharathi
 Vanaja and Saisri Priyamvatha

Season 2
The second season aired on every Sunday at 20:00 from 10 November 2019 to 8 March 2019 and ended with 17 Episodes. The winner of the season was Devi and her daughter Yuvina Parthavi. Actress Gayathri and her son Tharun was the runner-up. Archana Chandhoke and her daughter Zaara Vineet has officially once again been appointed as the host for the second time.

Contestants 
 Akila and Dhanaviruthika
 Anisha and Sasha
 Arthi and Theo
 Devi and Yuvina Parthavi
 Gayathri  and Tharun
 Janaki and Makshi
 Neepa and Shreya
 Nithya and Boshika
 Shanthi and Tharak
 Sulabha and Samrith

Season 3
The show launched on 4 September 2022 on every Sunday at 18:30 on Zee Tamil and streamed on ZEE5. Archana Chandhoke and her daughter Zaara Vineet has officially once again been appointed as the host for the third time. Khushbu as the judge. 

The final episode was aired on 1 January 2023 on Sunday at 5PM. The winner of the season was singer Roshini and his daughter Riya, Meera Krishna and Akshit was the runner-up.

 Winner: Roshini and Riya
 First Runners-Up: [Meera Krishna]] and Akshit

Finalists
 Shalini and Riya
 Meera Krishnan and Akshit
 Sophia and Aarin
 Roshini and Riya
 Sasi Laya and Yugansarvesh

Contestants 
 Abitha
 Amrutha and Aadiv
 Annabharathi and Ashikha
 Lakshmi Priya and Kiruthika
 Mennal and Anika
 Meera Krishna and Akshit
 Roshini and Riya
 Sasi Laya and Yugansarvesh
 Shalini and Riya
 Sophia and Aarin

Episodes

Super Mom Reunion
Super Mom Reunion is a special show. It premiered on 28 November 2021. Priya Raman as the judge and VJ Vijay and Poornitha as the hosts. The show will feature 13 celebrity mothers namely Deepa, Monica, Vanaja and Swedha from the first season of Super Mom along with Sulaba, Anisha, Shanthi, Nithya, Neepa, Devi, Arthi, Gayathri and Akila from the second season of Super Mom.

Contestants 
Season 1
 Deepa and Godwin
 Monica and Jaden
 Vanaja and Saisri Priyamvatha
 Swetha and Hrithik Bharathi

Season 2
 Akila and Dhanaviruthika
 Anisha and Sasha
 Arthi and Theo
 Devi and Yuvina Parthavi
 Gayathri and Tharun
 Neepa and Shreya
 Nithya and Boshika
 Shanthi and Tharak
 Sulabha and Samrith

References

External links
 
 Super Mom 3 at ZEE5

Zee Tamil original programming
Tamil-language children's television series
Tamil-language television shows
Tamil-language game shows
Tamil-language reality television series
2018 Tamil-language television series debuts
2018 Tamil-language television seasons
2019 Tamil-language television seasons
2022 Tamil-language television seasons
Television shows set in Tamil Nadu
2023 Tamil-language television series endings